Como is a town in Hopkins County, Texas, United States. The population was 702 at the 2010 census.

Texas politician Marshall Formby was born in Como in 1911. Former State Representative Erwin Cain practices law in Sulphur Springs but resides in Como with his wife and three children.

Geography
Como is in southeastern Hopkins County, along State Highway 11, which leads northwest  to Sulphur Springs, the county seat, and southeast  to Winnsboro.

Demographics

As of the 2020 United States census, there were 728 people, 215 households, and 186 families residing in the town.

Education
Como is served by the Como-Pickton Consolidated Independent School District.

References

External links
City of Como official website

Towns in Hopkins County, Texas
Towns in Texas